Patrick Péra (born 17 January 1949 in Lyon) is a French figure skater. He won the bronze medal in men's singles in the 1968 Winter Olympics, became one of the youngest male figure skating Olympic medalists. He won the bronze medal again at the 1972 Winter Olympics.

Competitive highlights

References

 French Championships Historical Results
 Sports-reference profile

Olympic figure skaters of France
Figure skaters at the 1968 Winter Olympics
Figure skaters at the 1972 Winter Olympics
Olympic bronze medalists for France
French male single skaters
1949 births
Living people
Sportspeople from Lyon
Olympic medalists in figure skating
World Figure Skating Championships medalists
European Figure Skating Championships medalists
Medalists at the 1972 Winter Olympics
Medalists at the 1968 Winter Olympics
20th-century French people